Sisanie Villaclara (born March 31, 1984, known professionally as just Sisanie) is an American radio DJ, talk show host and radio music director. Since 2015, she has been the morning show co-host at On Air With Ryan Seacrest which is syndicated nationally in the United States.

Early life and education 
From 2002 to 2007 she attended California State University, San Diego and studied art with emphasis in multimedia.

Career 
In 2004, at 19 years, she started out as intern at iHeartMedia (formerly Clear Channel) in San Diego, CA. In 2007, she was promoted to DJ and midday personality at 102.7 KISS FM, Los Angeles, CA. A few later she picked up the same role at a sister radio station Channel 933” KHTS in San Diego. She also hosted middays for iHeart stations across the United States.

Occasionally she would be a substitute host on On Air With Ryan Seacrest.

In December 2015, following the departure Ellen K. from On Air With Ryan Seacrest, Sisanie officially became the co-host.

Sisanie also runs a solo show at KISS-FM from 10-11am PST and hosts the podcast “Twinning with Sisanie.”

Since 2017, Sisanie has filled in for Kelly Ripa on the TV talk show Live with Kelly and Ryan several times.

In July 2022, she was promoted from the role of music coordinator to music director at KISS FM.

Personal life 
Sisanie is married to husband Michael since January 2014. They have 3 kids, twins (a boy named Maxon and girl named Aiza) born in 2018, and another girl (named Siveya) born in August 2021.

References 

American radio personalities
Living people
1984 births